Austin City Hall may refer to:

 Austin City Hall (Austin, Nevada)
 Austin City Hall (Austin, Texas)